Alik L. Alik (born January 26, 1953) is a diplomat and politician from the Federated States of Micronesia who was the Vice President of the Federated States of Micronesia from May 11, 2007 to May 11, 2015.

Born in Kosrae, Alik completed high school in 1973 and then left the island for education in the United States, attending United States International University in Hawaii from 1973 to 1976 and then Graceland College in Iowa from 1976 to 1979. After returning to Kosrae, Alik worked as a student counselor at the Kosrae High School for two years.

In 1982 he became a Foreign Service Officer for the FSM Department of External Affairs and promoted to Deputy Chief for the Division of South Pacific Affairs.

In 1989 Alik became first Micronesian ambassador to Fiji and served until 1998. While in Fiji he was also a cross-accredited as FSM's Ambassador to: Israel, Tonga, Nauru, Kiribati, Samoa, Tuvalu, Solomon Islands and Vanuatu. In 1998 he was appointed ambassador to Japan.

His political career began in 2003, when he won Kosrae State's at-large representative to the 13th FSM Congress in which he held chairmanship for the Committee on Resource and Development with membership on the Committees of Judiciary & Governmental Operations and also External Affairs. In 14th congress he assumed chairmanship of the Foreign Affairs Committee.

He was the second FSM diplomatic envoy to Israel, following Ambassador Jesse B. Marehalau, since the two countries formalized their relations on 23 November 1988.

Alik became the 7th Vice President of the Federated States of Micronesia on May 11, 2007.

He is married to former Shra C. Lonno. They have two children together.

References

External links

Official biography
Marianas Variety - FSM has new president, vice president, speaker 

1953 births
Living people
People from Kosrae
Vice presidents of the Federated States of Micronesia
Members of the Congress of the Federated States of Micronesia
Federated States of Micronesia diplomats
Ambassadors of the Federated States of Micronesia to Japan
Ambassadors of the Federated States of Micronesia to Israel
Ambassadors of the Federated States of Micronesia to Tonga
Ambassadors of the Federated States of Micronesia to Samoa
Ambassadors of the Federated States of Micronesia to Nauru
Ambassadors of the Federated States of Micronesia to Kiribati
Ambassadors of the Federated States of Micronesia to Tuvalu
Ambassadors of the Federated States of Micronesia to Vanuatu
Ambassadors of the Federated States of Micronesia to the Solomon Islands
United States International University alumni
Graceland University alumni